Giacomo Briano (1589–1649) was a Polish Jesuit and architect of Italian descent.

1589 births
1649 deaths
Ukrainian Baroque architects
17th-century Polish Jesuits